Events in the year 2012 in Turkey.

Incumbents
President: Abdullah Gül 
Prime Minister: Recep Tayyip Erdoğan

Events

Deaths
1 April – Ekrem Bora
12 April – Ayten Alpman
25 April – Şahap Kocatopçu
14 December – Ertuğ Ergin

See also
2012 in Turkish television
List of Turkish films of 2012

References

 
Years of the 21st century in Turkey
2010s in Turkey
Turkey
Turkey
Turkey